The TSHD Shoalway is a trailing suction hopper dredger, owned and operated by Royal Boskalis Westminster, originally intended for the British market and built in 2010.

Design 
The vessel was the first of four ships designed by Conoship International and D.W. den Herder maritiem, with a shallow draught and high manoeuvrability for difficult port construction, maintenance, land reclamation, coastal defense and offshore energy projects. The typical carpentry needed for a vessel of this kind was completed by Hans Dorgelo. It was the first dredger in the Boskalis fleet to use azimuth thrusters as its main means of propulsion. The ship is equipped with rainbow discharge valves for beach replenishment or land reclamation, two jet water engines for sediment dispersal, non-protruding bottom doors in the hopper (cargo hold) for dumping at sea and engines designed to stringent MARPOL sulphur emissions standards.

Capabilities 

Sister Vessels 
Its sister vessels of the Shoalway class include the Causeway, the Strandway and the Freeway.

References

External links
 
 Boskalis Official Fact Sheet 
 Bureau Veritas Class Specifications
 Conoship International : Ship designers 'Matchmakers' Innovators

Dredgers
Service vessels of the United Kingdom
2009 ships